Marc Sallefranque (born Dax, 6 April 1960) is a former French rugby union player. He played as a fullback and fly-half.

He played most of his career at US Dax, from 1968/69 to 1988/89. He joined the first team in 1978/79. He won the Challenge Yves du Manoir in 1982. He played for Montpellier Hérault in 1989/90, moving to Bègles-Bordeaux the following season. He represented this team from 1990/91 to 1992/93. He won the National Championship in 1990/91.

He had 4 caps for France, from 1981 to 1982, scoring 2 conversions, 4 penalties and 1 drop goal, 19 points on aggregate. He played 3 games at the 1982 Five Nations Championship, his only presence at the tournament, where he still scored 2 conversions and 4 penalties, 16 points on aggregate.

References

External links
Marc Sallefranque International Statistics

1960 births
Living people
French rugby union players
France international rugby union players
US Dax players
Montpellier Hérault Rugby players
Rugby union fly-halves
Rugby union fullbacks
People from Dax, Landes
Sportspeople from Landes (department)
CA Bordeaux-Bègles Gironde players